Organic farming in New Zealand dates from 1930 and began on a commercial scale in the 1980s. It is now an increasing segment of the framing market, with some of the larger companies such as Wattie's becoming involved.

Lincoln University, which has a strong focus on agricultural research, operates the Biological Husbandry Unit which first opened in 1976 and now focuses on organic and sustainable agriculture. The University also operates the 57 hectare Kowhai Farm that is managed to BIO-GRO Organic Production Standards.

Land use patterns show in 2002 there were 46,886 hectares of land certified as either fully organic or in transition to becoming fully organic.

Types of Farming in New Zealand 
There are five major types if farming in New Zealand: sheep, dairy, beef, horticulture, and aquaculture. New Zealand has approximately 25.14 million sheep, which is almost 5 times greater than the human population. Much less than sheep, but still a significant number, New Zealand has approximately 5.91 million dairy cattle. These two species play a significant role in New Zealand’s farming industry.

Government Influence on Policy 
The New Zealand government has been introducing regulations on farmers to help address environmental issues caused by agriculture. New Zealand’s agricultural land use contributes to 49% of the nation’s greenhouse gas emissions. New Zealand’s government has introduced policies to combat issues such as water quality, as well as sustainability-focused programs been developed to encourage change in farming practices.

Some specific legislations the New Zealand government has implemented include:

 $229 million over four years to the productive and sustainable land use package
 Maori Agribusiness Extension program
 Zero Carbon Amendment Act
 Biogenic methane emission to be reduced by 10% by 2030

These legislations are designed to work together to help reduce greenhouse gas emissions produced by agriculture.

The New Zealand government has developed an emissions reduction plan. It lays out targets and the actions that need to be made to reach those targets. This plan focuses on the transport, energy, building and construction, waste, agriculture and forestry industries. In terms of the agriculture industry, the New Zealand government has created targets they want to hit after the first emissions budget period. This includes the emissions that would occur if the plan was not followed, then the emissions if the plan was followed.

 Projected emissions without the initiatives in this plan – 163.1 Mt CO2-e
 Projected average annual emissions without the initiatives in this plan – 40.8Mt CO2-e
 Projected percentage of total gross emissions without the initiatives in this plan – 50%
 Estimated emissions reduction from the initiatives in this plan – 0.3 to 2.7 Mt CO2-e

Certification

While all commercial producers in New Zealand are subject to requirements under the Fair Trading Act, which covers misleading behaviour, there is no specific piece of legislation regulating organic certification in New Zealand but a number of standards are used including Demeter International, IFOAM and BioGro. BioGro is a New Zealand-based certification agency which formed in 1983. It has IFOAM, JAS and ISO17020 accreditation, which ensures certified providers access to educated consumers in a global marketplace. The first Demeter International registered farm was Shelly Beach Farm in Rodney District in 1979.

Organisations
The Experimental Circle of Anthroposophic Farmers and Gardeners began activities in New Zealand in 1930.

The Soil & Health Association of New Zealand established in 1941, promotes organic food and farming in New Zealand.

Organics Aotearoa New Zealand formed in 2005 as an umbrella organisation to represent all aspects of organics in New Zealand.

Willing Workers on Organic Farms (WWOOF), a network of organisations around the world placing volunteers on organic farms, have operated in New Zealand since 1974.

See also
Agriculture in New Zealand
Environment of New Zealand

References

External links
Organics Aotearoa New Zealand
Soil & Health Association of New Zealand
Organic farming in New Zealand at the Ministry of Agriculture and Forestry
New Zealand Biological Producers and Consumers Council
BioGro New Zealand Ltd
Biological Husbandry Unit at Lincoln University